Sing It Again Rod is the first compilation album by Rod Stewart released in 1973. The album is notable for its Peter Corriston-designed die-cut album sleeve (shaped like an old fashioned glass, and through which a smiling Stewart can be seen).

Track listing 
 "Reason to Believe" (Tim Hardin)
 "You Wear It Well" (Rod Stewart, Martin Quittenton)
 "Mandolin Wind" (Rod Stewart)
 "Country Comfort" (Elton John, Bernie Taupin)
 "Maggie May" (Rod Stewart, Martin Quittenton)
 "Handbags and Gladrags" (Mike D'Abo)
 "Street Fighting Man" (Mick Jagger, Keith Richards)
 "Twistin' the Night Away" (Sam Cooke)
 "Lost Paraguayos" (Rod Stewart, Ron Wood)
 "(I Know) I'm Losing You" (Norman Whitfield, Eddie Holland, Cornelius Grant)
 "Pinball Wizard" (from the rock opera Tommy) (Pete Townshend)
 "Gasoline Alley" (Rod Stewart, Ron Wood)

Personnel 
 Album design – "Shakey Pete Corriston" (Peter Corriston)
 Photography – Cosimo Scianna, Emerson, Loew and Steve Azzara

Charts

Certifications

References 

1973 compilation albums
Rod Stewart compilation albums
Mercury Records compilation albums
Albums produced by Rod Stewart
Albums recorded at Morgan Sound Studios
Albums recorded at Olympic Sound Studios
Albums with cover art by Peter Corriston